Louisella is a genus of worm known from the Middle Cambrian Burgess Shale. It was originally described by Charles Walcott in 1911 as a holothurian echinoderm, and represents a senior synonym of Miskoia, which was originally described as an annelid. 48 specimens of Louisella are known from the Greater Phyllopod bed, where they comprise < 0.1% of the community.  It has been stated to have palaeoscolecid-like sclerites, though this is not in fact the case.

It's also been interpreted as an annelid  and a sipunculan, (neither on particularly compelling grounds) and a pripaulid, but it is more conservatively considered to represent an ecdysozoan worm; deep ecdysozoan relationships are not yet well resolved, making a more precise affiliation challenging.

References

External links 
 

Burgess Shale fossils
Burgess Shale animals
Prehistoric protostome genera
Cambrian genus extinctions
Priapulida